Walid Hassan may refer to:

 Walid Hassan (comedian) (1959-2006), Iraqi comedian and actor
 Walid Hassan (footballer) (born 1991), Sudanese footballer